Vytautas Paukštė (2 July 1932 – 21 July 2022) was a Lithuanian actor. He appeared in more than forty films between 1968 and his death.

Selected filmography

References

External links 
 

1932 births
2022 deaths
Actors from Kaunas
Lithuanian male film actors
Soviet male actors
Lithuanian Academy of Music and Theatre alumni
20th-century Lithuanian male actors
21st-century Lithuanian male actors
Recipients of the Lithuanian National Prize
Commander's Crosses of the Order for Merits to Lithuania